Tickets is a 2005 comedy-drama anthology film directed by Ermanno Olmi, Abbas Kiarostami and Ken Loach. It was written by Ermanno Olmi, Abbas Kiarostami, and Paul Laverty. Three interconnected stories unfold on a train journey from Innsbruck to Rome.

Cast
 Carlo Delle Piane, 
 Valeria Bruni Tedeschi 
 Silvana De Santis 
 Filippo Trojano 
 Gary Maitland 
 William Ruane

Home media
The film was released on DVD by Artificial Eye for region 2. The extras feature the original theatrical trailer, behind the scenes footage, director and cast interviews, production notes and filmographies.

See also
List of Iranian films

References

External links

2005 films
Films scored by George Fenton
Films directed by Abbas Kiarostami
Films directed by Ken Loach
Films directed by Ermanno Olmi
Films set on trains
Iranian comedy-drama films
Italian comedy-drama films
British comedy-drama films
2005 comedy-drama films
2000s British films